Apantesis virgo, the virgin tiger moth, is a moth of the family Erebidae. The species was first described by Carl Linnaeus in his 1758 10th edition of Systema Naturae. It is found in North America from Newfoundland south to Florida west to Alberta.

The wingspan is about 56 mm. The colour of the hindwings varies from yellow to scarlet, with one or more median dark blotches in addition to the discal spot.

The larvae feed on various low-growing plants, including Thermopsis rhombifolia and Plantago species. The species overwinters in the larval stage.

This species was formerly a member of the genus Grammia, but was moved to Apantesis along with the other species of the genera Grammia, Holarctia, and Notarctia.

Subspecies
Apantesis virgo virgo (from the Great Lakes region and Atlantic seaboard south through New England, to at least West Virginia. In the west, the range extends to north-eastern British Columbia)
Apantesis virgo gigas B. C. Schmidt, 2009 (south-eastern United States, including the Great Smoky Mountains, south to Georgia and northern Florida)

References

Arctiina
Moths described in 1758
Taxa named by Carl Linnaeus
Moths of North America